Midnight in Peking is a true crime written by Paul French concerning the murder of Pamela Werner. It was first published by Penguin Australia in association with Penguin China in 2011 and has since been published by Penguin Books in the UK and by Penguin Group USA. It has appeared on international best seller lists including the New York Times Best Seller List and the South China Morning Post Best Seller List. Additionally the book was adapted for radio by BBC Radio 4.

Summary
The victim was Pamela Werner, 19-year-old daughter of retired British consul E. T. C. Werner and academic resident in Peking. Her killing and mutilation while cycling home from an evening of ice skating remain solved. The expatriate community in Peking were shocked at the crime which, without specific evidence, was variously attributed to a Japanese secret society or an American organized sex ring. An Englishman resident in China claimed to have been informed by Japanese military officers that Werner's death was in retaliation for the killing of a Japanese soldier by British soldiers in a drunken brawl. Although the source was a known eccentric, British diplomats provisionally accepted this account while not taking the matter further.

Adaptation 
Kudos Film and Television have plans for an onscreen adaptation of Midnight in Peking as a miniseries. The Executive Producer of the TV adaptation is Ollie Madden.

Awards 
 2013 Edgar Award for Best Fact Crime
 2013 Crime Writers' Association Dagger Award for Non-Fiction
 2013 Mystery Readers International Macavity Awards for Best Mystery Non-Fiction (nominated) 
 2012 Australian Book Industry Awards - International Success of the Year, 2012

References

External links 
Official website for Midnight in Peking

Non-fiction crime books
2011 non-fiction books
Edgar Award-winning works
Works about unsolved crimes
1937 in China
Murder in China
Books about Beijing
Penguin Books books